Nazeeb Saiyed (born 1 December 1995) is an Indian cricketer. He made his Twenty20 debut on 11 January 2021, for Arunachal Pradesh in the 2020–21 Syed Mushtaq Ali Trophy. He made his List A debut on 21 February 2021, for Arunachal Pradesh in the 2020–21 Vijay Hazare Trophy. He made his first-class debut on 17 February 2022, for Arunachal Pradesh in the 2021–22 Ranji Trophy.

References

External links
 

1995 births
Living people
Indian cricketers
Arunachal Pradesh cricketers
Place of birth missing (living people)